Zittau is an unincorporated community located in the town of Wolf River, Winnebago County, Wisconsin, United States.

Economy
Zittau is home to the Union Star Cheese Factory, producer of numerous Wisconsin cheese varieties, including daily cheese curds.

Notes

Unincorporated communities in Winnebago County, Wisconsin
Unincorporated communities in Wisconsin